Praise & Worship is an album by the American contemporary gospel music group Commissioned, released on June 13, 2006 via Verity Records/Legacy Records

Track listing
 "Let Me Tell It" (4:34)
 "We Shall Behold Him" (6:35)
 "Love U with the Rest of My Life" (5:50)
 "Please You More" (6:26)
 "Everlasting Love" (5:00)
 "King of Glory [live]" (5:40)
 "'Tis So Sweet [live]" (3:50)
 "Unworthy" (4:34)
 "You Keep on Blessing Me [live]" (3:09)
 "Thank You for Loving Me" (4:50)
 "Testify" (4:26)
 "I Can't Live Without U [live]" (5:42)

References

Commissioned (gospel group) albums
2006 albums